Reijo Ruotsalainen (born April 1, 1960) is a Finnish former ice hockey defenceman. He was twice named Finland's top defenceman, and won two Stanley Cups with the Edmonton Oilers, in 1987 and 1990.

Playing career
Ruotsalainen started his career in Kärpät. Nicknamed "Reksa" or "Rexi", he was recognized as a talented defenseman while playing for Kärpät junior teams. Kärpät was promoted to SM-liiga from 1. Divisioona for the 1977–78 season, and Ruotsalainen played 30 games and posted 23 points in his first SM-liiga season. During the 1979–80 season, Ruotsalainen and Kärpät played in the SM-liiga Playoffs, but were eliminated from the Finals by HIFK. Kärpät, however, won the bronze medal series, 2–0, against TPS. The 1980–81 season proved to be a breakthrough for Ruotsalainen. Kärpät made the finals against Tappara, coming from behind in the fifth and decisive game, winning the game 5–2. After his first Championship in SM-liiga, Ruotsalainen headed to National Hockey League (NHL).

Ruotsalainen was signed by the New York Rangers of the NHL in 1981. During his debut season, he scored 56 points in 78 games. Initially paired on defense with Barry Beck, Ruotsalainen was eventually moved to forward. Coach Herb Brooks said Ruotsalainen was the best skater in NHL. Ruotsalainen's fluid skating helped him compensate for his lack of size. Ruotsalainen had his NHL-career high in points during the 1984–85 NHL season, leading the Rangers in scoring with 73 points in 80 games. Ruotsalainen played in the 1986 NHL All-Star game.

Ruotsalainen's contract expired after the conclusion of the 1985–86 NHL season, and he accepted an offer from SC Bern of the Swiss Nationalliga A. Ruotsalainen played in 35 games and scored 53 points for SC Bern before returning to the NHL.

Ruotsalainen was signed by the Edmonton Oilers for the remainder of the 1986–87 NHL season and was given a spot on Defense. The Oilers went on to win the Stanley Cup at the end of the season, and Ruotsalainen's name was added to the Cup for the first time.

Ruotsalainen next signed with HV71 in Sweden, with whom Ruotsalainen scored 32 points in 40 games.

After his single season in Sweden, Ruotsalainen was again contracted by SC Bern, playing a single season for them, scoring 46 points in 36 games.

Ruotsalainen returned to the NHL after a two-season absence, starting the 1989–90 NHL season with the New Jersey Devils. He was traded to Edmonton after 31 games, leading to winning his second Stanley Cup, as the Oilers won the Cup for the fifth time, the first without Wayne Gretzky.

Ruotsalainen returned to Europe and played for SC Bern, yet again, in a tenure that lasted for three seasons. Ruotsalainen scored 38 points during his first season back in Bern.

Ruotsalainen returned to his "home team" when he was contracted by Kärpät in 1993, by which time had been relegated back to 1. Divisioona. Ruotsalainen played four games for Kärpät, scoring 6 points. Ruotsalainen was acquired by SM-liiga team Tappara for reminder of the 1993–94 season. Ruotsalainen played six regular season games with Tappara and scored 6 points, and 3 points in 9 playoff games, as Tappara was eliminated by TPS in the semifinals.

After his season in Finland, Ruotsalainen accepted a contract offer from SC Bern for the 1994–95 season, and played 19 games and had 10 points.

Ruotsalainen returned to Finland for the 1995–96 season and played for KalPa with 8 points in 16 games. He was contracted mid-season to Swiss team ZSC Lions, where he played 18 games with 15 points.

After his season in Zürich, Ruotsalainen ended his career in Finland, playing for Kärpät in the Finnish 1. Divisioona for two more seasons, scoring 31 points in 44 games during his Final season.

Ruotsalainen ended his career in 1998. His jersey #10 is currently retired by Kärpät.

International career

Ruotsalainen played for the Finnish junior national team from 1975 to 1980, winning bronze at the European Junior Championships in 1976 and silver at the World Junior Championships in 1980, where he together with Tomas Jonsson were appointed best defencemen of tournament. He played for the Finnish national team at the IIHF World Championships in 1978, 1979, 1981, 1985, and 1989, the 1988 Winter Olympics (winning silver) and the 1981 and the 1987 Canada Cups.  

Ruotsalainen became a coach after his playing career. He was an assistant coach with the Miami Matadors of the ECHL during their only season in 1998–99.

He is a member of the Finnish Ice Hockey Hall of Fame.

Awards and achievements
1980–81 - SM-Liiga - Kanada-malja (Kärpät)
1986–87 - NHL - Stanley Cup (Edmonton)
1988–89 - NDA - Swiss League Champion (SC Bern)
1989–90 - NHL - Stanley Cup (Edmonton)
1990–91 - NDA - Swiss League Champion (SC Bern)
1991–92 - NDA - Swiss League Champion (SC Bern)
 In the 2009 book 100 Ranger Greats, was ranked No. 82 all-time of the 901 New York Rangers who had played during the team's first 82 seasons

Career statistics

Regular season and playoffs

International

Awards and honors
 Directorate Award, Best Defenseman, 1980 IIHF world junior hockey championships

References

External links
 

1960 births
Edmonton Oilers players
Finnish ice hockey defencemen
HV71 players
Ice hockey players at the 1988 Winter Olympics
KalPa players
Oulun Kärpät players
Living people
National Hockey League All-Stars
New Jersey Devils players
New York Rangers draft picks
New York Rangers players
Olympic ice hockey players of Finland
Olympic silver medalists for Finland
Sportspeople from Oulu
SC Bern players
Stanley Cup champions
Tappara players
ZSC Lions players
Ice hockey players with retired numbers
Olympic medalists in ice hockey
Medalists at the 1988 Winter Olympics